Nipissing West was a provincial electoral district in the Canadian province of Ontario, active from 1902 to 1908.

Due to population growth, the district of Nipissing was divided into Nipissing West and Nipissing East for the 1902 election. By 1908, however, the town of Sudbury had grown enough to warrant its own electoral district. The electoral district of Sudbury was carved from Nipissing West that year, while the remainder of Nipissing West became the new district of Sturgeon Falls.

Members of Provincial Parliament

References

Former provincial electoral districts of Ontario